Gobbaragumpi is a village in Dharwad district of Karnataka, India.

Demographics 
As of the 2011 Census of India there were 293 households in Gobbaragumpi and a total population of 1,548 consisting of 812 males and 736 females. There were 204 children ages 0-6.

References

Villages in Dharwad district